Gabriel is a messenger angel or an archangel in the Abrahamic religions. 

Gabriel may also refer to:

People

 Gabriel (given name), a given name
 Gabriel (surname)
 Saint Gabriel (disambiguation)
 Gabriel, pen name of the Scottish cartoonist Jimmy Friell
 Gabriel (judge royal), a nobleman in the Kingdom of Hungary
 Gabriel (footballer, born 1984), full name João Gabriel da Silva, Brazilian defender
 Gabriel (footballer, born 1988), full name Gabriel Rodrigues de Moura, Brazilian defender
Gabriel (footballer, born July 1992), full name Gabriel Girotto Franco, Brazilian midfielder
Gabriel (footballer, born September 1992), full name Gabriel Vasconcelos Ferreira, Brazilian goalkeeper
Gabriel (footballer, born 1998), full name Gabriel José Ferreira Mesquita, Brazilian goalkeeper
 Gabriel Paulista (born 1990), Brazilian football defender
 Gabriel Barbosa (born 1996), Brazilian footballer forward, also known as Gabigol
 Gabriel Magalhães (born 1997) Brazilian football defender
 Gabriel Souza (born 1997), Brazilian football goalkeeper
 Gabriel Jesus (born 1997), Brazilian football forward
 Gabriel Martinelli (born 2001), Brazilian football forward

Places
 Gabriel Lake, a source of the Opawica River in Québec, Canada
 Gabriel Island, Nunavut, Canada
 Mount Gabriel, Ireland
 San Gabriel, California, United States
 Plaza de Gabriel Lodares, a square in Albacete, Castile-La Mancha, Spain

Art, entertainment and media
Gabriel, an 1839 play by George Sand
 .Gabriel, a 2010 opera by Robert J. Bradshaw
 St. Gabriel Radio, WVSG 820, Columbus, Ohio

Film
 Gabriel (1976 film), a film by Canadian-American painter Agnes Martin
 Gabriel (2007 film), 2007 supernatural action film
 Gabriel (2014 film), 2014 thriller drama film

Music

Artists
 Gabríel (rapper), Icelandic rapper

Albums
 Gabriel (Believer album), 2009

Songs
 "Gabriel" (Joe Goddard song), 2011
 "Gabriel" (Najoua Belyzel song), 2005
 "Gabriel" (Roy Davis Jr. and Peven Everett song), 1997
 "Gabriel", a 2001 song by UK electronic music duo Lamb on the album What Sound

Other uses
 Gabriel (New-Gen), a fictional character in American comic books by Marvel Comics
 Gabriel (missile), an Israeli anti-ship missile
 , various ships of the Royal Navy of the United Kingdom
 Gabriel (amplifiers), American manufacturer of audio equipment

See also
 Gabriel's Horn, a paradox in geometry
 Gabriela (disambiguation)
 Gabriele, a given name and a surname
 Gibril (disambiguation)
 Jibril (disambiguation)